Vladimir Markelov may refer to:

 Vladimir Markelov (ice hockey) (born 1987), Russian ice hockey forward
 Vladimir Markelov (gymnast) (born 1957), Russian former gymnast